Biduino or Biduinus (active c. 1173 – 1194) was an Italian sculptor and architect from the Romanesque period, active around Pisa and Lucca. His name is attributed to having been born in Bidogno in Val, near Lugano.

Works
Works attributed to this artist are found in:
Santi Ippolito e Cassiano, San Casciano, near Pisa
San Paolo all'Orto
Parish Church of Saint John and Saint Ermolao, Calci
Sant'Alessandro, Lucca
San Salvatore, Lucca
sarcofago giudice Giratto Camposanto, galleria sud,  Pisa

References

12th-century Italian architects
12th-century Italian sculptors
Italian male sculptors